House at 378 Glen Avenue is a historic home located at Sea Cliff in Nassau County, New York.  It was built in 1886 and is a two-story clapboard-sided residence with a sweeping gable roof in the Late Victorian style.  It features a two-storey porch that surrounds the building and has lattice work on the first floor, scrollsawn corner braces, balustrade, and decorative detailing.

It was listed on the National Register of Historic Places in 1988.

References

Houses on the National Register of Historic Places in New York (state)
Victorian architecture in New York (state)
Houses completed in 1886
Houses in Nassau County, New York
National Register of Historic Places in Nassau County, New York